Flóra Burányi (born 6 November 1990) is a blind Hungarian Paralympic judoka who competes in international level events. She is a European bronze medalist and she competed at the 2016 Summer Paralympics.

References

1990 births
Living people
Sportspeople from Eger
Hungarian female judoka
Paralympic judoka of Hungary
Judoka at the 2016 Summer Paralympics
Hungarian blind people
Visually impaired category Paralympic competitors
21st-century Hungarian women